Your Own Worst Enemy may refer to:

"Your Own Worst Enemy", a song by Alice Cooper on his 2005 album Dirty Diamonds
"Your Own Worst Enemy", a song by Bruce Springsteen on his 2007 album Magic
"Your Own Worst Enemy", a song by They Might Be Giants on their 1996 album Factory Showroom
Your Own Worst Enemy, a 1981 British television documentary featuring Rob Buckman